Nali Sauce is a popular sauce from Malawi dubbed, "'Africa's hottest peri-peri sauce'. It is one of Malawi's most popular sauces. The Nali sauce brands have attained cult status with chilli lovers both in Malawi and throughout the world for their hotness and taste. The heat level of Nali sauce is approximately Piri piri 175.000 scoville heat units 
 
Nali is made from peri-peri sauce from Malawian birds eye chillies which are the hottest in Africa. They have been produced by Nali ltd since the 1970s. There are currently 7 different flavors of Nali Sauces: Mild, Hot, Gold, Garlic, Ginger, Curry Masala and BBQ. The label on the bottle comes with a warning in English and Chichewa that reads, "Abale Samalani", friends, take care.
Nali has a strong presence in Zambia, Zimbabwe, Tanzania, Kenya, Mozambique and South Africa.

History
Nali Limited was founded in 1974 in Limbe, Malawi by Alford Nalilo Khoromana in Thyolo District. It was set up as a proprietorship. It was incorporated as a company on 15 December
1983 as Nali Farms Limited. It later changed to Nali Limited on 12 November 1985. Nali has, since the early 1970s, been engaged in the growing and exporting spices including the popular Birds Eye chilies that are only found in Africa. Nali was able to grow into a successful commercial enterprise. Nali hot sauces are their most popular product line.

Production
Towards the end of 1978, Nali chilies were in great demand. Nali Limited is the only company in Malawi involved in the processing and selling of sauces and condiments for both local markets and export markets. They currently produce Nali Sauce and other agricultural products. It currently has about 3,000 farmers that help to grow the chillis.

Varieties
There are currently 8 different flavors of Nali Sauces: Hot, Gold, Garlic, Ginger, Curry Masala Chicken BBQ, Steak BBQ and Kambuzi.

Packaging
The label on the bottle comes with a warning in English and Chichewa that reads, "Abale Samalani", friends, take care.

Management
Since Mr. Khoromana's death in October 1997, Nali is now run by Mrs. Orpa Barlucchi, daughter of the founder. The company is owned by the Khoromana family. The Board Chair is Mrs. M. Khoromana (wife of the Late Mr. Khoromana).

External links
 Nali video
 Online Store

References

Companies of Malawi
Malawian culture
Hot sauces
Products introduced in 1974